Norwood is the third most populous city in Hamilton County, Ohio, United States, and an enclave of the larger city of Cincinnati.  The population was 19,207 at the 2010 census.  Originally settled as an early suburb of Cincinnati in the wooded countryside north of the city, the area is characterized by older homes and tree-lined streets.

History

Early history

The earliest humans in the area now known as Norwood are believed to have been Pre-Columbian era people of the Adena culture. Norwood Mound, a prehistoric earthwork mound built by the Adena, is located in Norwood and listed on the National Register of Historic Places. The Adena constructed the mound at the location of Norwood's present-day Water Tower Park, which is the highest land elevation in the city and one of the highest in all of Hamilton County. Archaeologists believe the mound was built at this site due to the high elevation and was used by the Adena for religious ceremonies and smoke signaling.

Native American mounds are not uncommon in Ohio and several were located in Downtown Cincinnati at the time of arrival of the first white settlers. However, by 1895, the Norwood Mound was the only remaining mound in the vicinity of Cincinnati." The mound has never been excavated, but it is reported that many artifacts found in the area by early Norwood settlers in the 1800s made up the original nucleus of the Native American Art Collection of the Cincinnati Art Museum. In the early-20th century, Norwood High School named their sports team mascot the Indians in honor of this local Native American heritage.

Sharpsburg settlement
In 1787, the United States Congress established the Northwest Territory, and John Cleves Symmes, Congressman from New Jersey, purchased  of the territory (the Symmes Purchase), within which the future Norwood is located. One year later, the first permanent settlement on the banks of the Ohio River in what would later become Cincinnati was established. In 1793, General "Mad Anthony" Wayne led several companies of troops from Fort Washington in Cincinnati to advance against a hostile tribe of Native Americans encamped on the banks of the nearby Millcreek in what is now St. Bernard. Historians believe that a company of troops under the direction of General Wayne made their way through Norwood during this campaign and widened an old Native American trail, which followed the path of present-day Smith Road, Montgomery Road, and Carthage Avenue. In 1859, an early Norwood pioneer named Joseph G. Langdon claimed to have found a bullet buried in the heart of an oak tree on his Norwood property left by Anthony Wayne's troops 66 years earlier.

In 1794, a pioneer named Peter Smith settled on Duck Creek in or near the current location of Norwood. It is believed he is one of the earliest Norwood settlers, if not the first. Soon after, a road was built connecting the early settlement of Columbia on the Ohio River near the Little Miami River with the settlement of Carthage, just north of Cincinnati. This road cut through Norwood along the old Indian Path widened by General Wayne's troops (Smith Road, Montgomery Road, and Carthage Avenue). Anthony Wayne's victory over the Indians at the Battle of Fallen Timbers the same year signaled the end of the Northwest Indian War which enabled pioneers to begin settling former hostile lands such as the future Norwood. In 1795, another road was built along the present-day path of Montgomery Road, connecting Cincinnati with Montgomery, Ohio and beyond. Montgomery Road was known as the "State Road" and Smith Road/Carthage Avenue was known as the "County Road."

In 1809, a settler named Samuel D. Bowman purchased land near the crossing of the State Road and the County Road, where he established a tavern and coach stop for travelers. He was soon joined by John Sharp, who built a cabin and small country store at the opposite side of the intersection. The community of half a dozen houses soon became known as "Sharpsburg", after Mr. Sharp. For the next half century, the little coach stop along the road between Cincinnati and Columbus didn't create much of a stir in the world.

Sharpsburg becomes Norwood
In 1866, the first tracks of the Marietta and Cincinnati Railroad were completed, connecting Loveland with Cincinnati. The tracks ran from east to west through Sharpsburg and still exist in the same location today, parallel to the Norwood Lateral Expressway and passing under the Montgomery Road overpass. The village did not initially have a train station when the railway opened, but the possibility of passenger rail access to Cincinnati generated interest in developing a residential subdivision nearby. In 1868, two early developments were platted in the area north of the railroad, the Joseph G. Langdon Subdivision at Sharpsburg on the east side of Montgomery Road, and the Baker Addition to Sharpsburg on the west. The first train station was opened on Langdon's Sharpsburg development in 1868.

In 1869, Sylvester H. Parvin, Col. Philander P. Lane and Lemuel Bolles purchased the William Ferguson farm north of the Marietta and Cincinnati Railroad tracks and platted an eighty-one-acre subdivision they called Norwood Heights. This was the first recorded use of the name Norwood in the area.  It is commonly believed that the person who came up with the name was Sarah Bolles, wife of Lemuel Bolles. In the 1894 book, Norwood, Her Homes and Her People, it was stated that the name "Sharpsburg" was "not considered pretty enough for such a spot, and the suggestion of Mr. and Mrs. Bolles to call it Norwood (an abbreviation of Northwood) met with endorsement, and so it was that the suburb was christened anew."

However, the origin of the name Norwood is commonly disputed. It is also stated that Mrs. Bolles's name for the 1869 Norwood Heights subdivision was inspired by Henry Ward Beecher's popular 1869 novel Norwood: or, Village Life in New England. Others have claimed Mrs. Bolles arrived at the name by combining "North Woods", in reference to Norwood being a wooded area north of Cincinnati.  In any case, the new name Norwood was popular enough that the Cincinnati Enquirer reported in 1870 that "the old town of Sharpsburg has been changed to Norwood" and the Sharpsburg post office was officially renamed Norwood the same year. By 1873, a second subdivision using the Norwood name, "The Heart of Norwood", was platted on 50-acres west of Montgomery Road at Maple and Elm Avenues. It would later be referred to as "Old Norwood" after newer subdivisions using the name Norwood were built.

Railroads and subdivisions
Despite the initial interest in Norwood generated by the arrival of the Marietta and Cincinnati Railroad, the new subdivisions were premature and failed to immediately take off. Only one home, located on the hill east of Norwood Mound, was constructed in the Norwood Heights subdivision. Norwood still remained largely farmland and orchards throughout the 1870s and the population had only grown to 423 people by the end of the decade. Although the Marietta and Cincinnati railroad provided transportation to Cincinnati, it was via an inconvenient circuitous route which followed the Millcreek several miles out of the way to the west. For Norwood to thrive as a suburb, it would need a direct rail connection with downtown.

In 1875, several prominent local property owners in Norwood approached the Lebanon Narrow-gauge Railway Company (later known as the Cincinnati, Lebanon and Northern Railway) to discuss building a passenger railroad between Norwood and downtown Cincinnati. The property owners offered their land to the railroad for use as free right-of-way. The railroad agreed and began to lay tracks from the northeast to southwest through Norwood and Avondale in the late-1870s. These tracks followed Lafayette Avenue and ran behind what is today's Surrey Square Shopping Center.

Around the same time, construction was started on another railroad, the Cincinnati and Eastern Railway, which was built west to east along the present-day border of Norwood and Evanston. Remains of this line were still visible in the former rail yard south of Lexington Avenue at Regent Avenue until 2018. The tracks continued along Wasson Road in Hyde Park, connecting Norwood with Cincinnati's eastern suburbs and ultimately Portsmouth, Ohio. This line merged with the Cincinnati, Lebanon and Northern line southwest of Norwood at Idlewild, which was the name for the area near the present day campus of Xavier University.

In 1881, the northern section of the Cincinnati, Lebanon and Northern opened, connecting Norwood with Lebanon. In 1882, the southern section opened, providing service from Norwood directly to the downtown station at Court Street and Gilbert Avenue. Later in the year, the Cincinnati and Eastern Railway opened, providing passenger service from Norwood to the Mornington Station at Edwards Road in Hyde Park and beyond.

The arrival of the passenger railroad proved to be the catalyst for rapid population growth in Norwood, as Cincinnatians could now work downtown and comfortably commute to their homes in the suburban countryside. Travel time between Norwood and downtown was less than 20 minutes, which was a short commute, even by today's standards.

Within a few years after the opening of the Cincinnati, Lebanon and Northern, several train stations were constructed in Norwood along the route. From south to north, they were Idlewild (north side of Dana Avenue and Idlewild Avenue), Ivanhoe (southeast corner of Ivanhoe Avenue and Williams Avenue), Hopkins (southeast corner of Montgomery Road and Ashland Avenue), Norwood Park (southwest corner of Smith Road and Laffayette Avenue) and East Norwood (southwest of Forest Avenue and Harris Avenue). The Hopkins Station, located at 4226 Montgomery Road, is the last of these buildings still standing. The structure has been occupied by many small businesses since it ceased operation as a passenger station in the late-1920s. The East Norwood Station remained in operation as a railroad control tower, until vandals burned it down in late-May 2000.

Village of Norwood
The 1880s in Norwood were marked by the development of several new subdivisions and significant municipal improvements throughout the village. Starting in 1881, L. C. Hopkins's platted his East Norwood subdivision on 46-acres of land between Harris Avenue and Highland Avenue (much of this neighborhood was eliminated in the early-1960s with the construction of the Norwood Lateral). It is likely that the Cincinnati, Lebanon and Northern railroad influenced Hopkins to build here as the neighborhood surrounded the newly laid tracks.

The first Norwood Town Hall was constructed in 1882 on donated land on the southwest corner of Montgomery Road and Elm Avenue by elected officials of the Norwood Town Hall Association. The hall was constructed at the demand of local residents who wanted a village center for church services, business activities, dances, plays, and other community functions. The Norwood Town Hall Association was instrumental in leading the effort to incorporate Norwood as a village in later years.

In 1885, development started on the South Norwood subdivision. The first houses were located around Ashland Avenue, which later became known as the "Presidential Neighborhood" because the cross streets were named after the first five United States presidents.

A four-room Central School schoolhouse was erected in 1887 on Montgomery Road (where LaRosa's Pizza now sits) to meet the education demands of the rapidly growing village. A one-room school house for Columbia Township had existed at this location possibly as early as 1828. Just one year after construction, the 1887 school house was expanded to eight rooms, as the number of students enrolled had already doubled. The estimated population of the South Norwood, East Norwood and "old" Norwood subdivisions in 1887 was 3,000.

In late 1887, residents of East Norwood raise money to install 18 gas street lamps in their subdivision, making East Norwood the first lighted neighborhood in the village.

Norwood's first fire brigade was organized in South Norwood in January 1888. Only six days later, the brigade was called into action to fight a gasoline fire in the basement of the home of Robert Leslie, which was the first house built on Floral Avenue. Firefighters were able to extinguish the blaze using buckets of water and save Mr. Leslie's home. The house still stands today at 4243 Floral Avenue.

As the village continued to grow, the ambitious leaders of the Town Hall Association knew the only way to sustain continued civic improvements was to incorporate as a village. One of the main incentives for incorporation was to provide public street lighting. The leaders started proceedings in early-1888 and on May 14, 1888, the Village of Norwood was formally incorporated by approval of the County Commissioners of Hamilton County. The signers of the petition were almost the entire male adult population of a total census of 1,000. Three months later, the first municipal elections were held and Dr. John C. Weyer was elected the village's first mayor.

Norwood continued to expand the boundaries of the village in 1889 by annexing land bordering the original subdivisions. The same year, work was started on a new subdivision called Elsmere, between Williams Avenue and Hudson Avenue. In 1891, Norwood Council annexed Elsmere as part of the village. These two annexations were the first of thirteen conducted by Norwood between 1889 and 1981.

Streetcars and Water Works
Around the time of Norwood's incorporation, local leaders began pushing for an electric streetcar route on Montgomery Road to connect Norwood with downtown. Until this time, Montgomery Road (known as "The Pike") was a privately owned turnpike, requiring users pay a toll to use the road. This private ownership became a sore spot for local residents who desired public streetcar transportation. With the help of the County Commissioners of Hamilton County and the State of Ohio, Norwood was able to purchase the road for public use and construction was started on an electric railway.

In mid-1891, the Norwood Electric Railway streetcar line was completed between Norwood and Walnut Hills, with the route extending to a turnaround at the Mount Adams Incline. On July 4, 1891, Norwood dedicated the opening of the streetcar line with a grand celebration for the ages. Officials and residents from surrounding communities were invited. The new streetcars and prominent buildings along Montgomery Road were decorated with flags and bunting. A base ball game was played between the "Norwoods" and the visiting "Linwoods", both of the Miami Valley League. At noon, the First Artillery Regiment fired five cannons and then presented a forty-four gun salute. The Great Western Band played "America" at Norwood Town Hall and politicians from as far away as California addressed the crowds. A dance was held in the evening, followed by a fireworks show of rockets, Roman candles and fountains. Officials estimated 10,000 people paid the 5-cent fare to ride the streetcar home to Cincinnati after the celebration. Some streetcar stops were crowded with as many as 500 passengers waiting for cars.

School enrollment was so great by 1891, that the Board of Education constructed two new schools to serve the growing district. Williams School (later Williams Avenue Elementary) was opened in on Williams Avenue and Marion School (later North Norwood School) was opened on Marion Avenue. Both buildings were later replaced with newer structures that still stand today.

Clean drinking water was one of the most important issues facing Norwood in its early days. Residents had to rely on private wells, cisterns or streams for their water. In 1892, the citizens of Norwood voted for a public "water works" system to be built, including multiple wells, a pumping station, and a water tower. In 1894, the Norwood Water Works was completed with six artesian wells and a pumping station at the southeast corner of Harris Avenue and Pine Street. A 100-foot steel water tower was constructed west of Norwood Mound, where it still stands today. Nine more wells were eventually drilled and the Water Works supplied Norwood with clean water for sixty-five years.  The community marked the opening of the Water Works with a jubilee celebration, and the book Norwood, Her Homes and Her People by Ren Mulford Jr. and Wertner G. Betty was published as a souvenir for the occasion.

In March 1894, Norwood's first newspaper, the Norwood Enterprise, began publication. It would stay in print until 1989.

Norwood's first high school was an 8-room building constructed alongside a nearly identical new 12-room elementary school building on Allison Street between Courtland and Weyer Avenues. Both schools opened in 1897 and are believed to have been designed by prominent Cincinnati architect, Samuel Hannaford, who also designed the similar Venetian Gothic-styled Cincinnati Music Hall. Norwood's population had grown to an estimated at 7,000 residents the year prior to the school opening, and this was the first time Norwood offered a full four-year high school curriculum. The north high school building was destroyed by fire in 1917, but the south elementary building still stands today at the corner of Allison Street and Weyer Avenue.

Early industry
In 1898, George Bullock relocated his Bullock Electric Manufacturing Company to the northeast corner of Forest Avenue and Park avenue and it became one of Norwood's first industrial plants, following McFarlan Lumber Company on Montgomery Pike and the Cincinnati Brick Company on Duck Creek. The plant was eventually acquired by German company, Siemens, and still remains in operation to this day in the same building. In 1900, the Globe Wernicke Company constructed a new factory on a 14-acre site on Carthage Avenue in Norwood for the manufacture of wooden bookcases (the bookcases are now collectible and desirable antiques). In 1901, the United States Playing Card Company moved to its new facilities on Beech Avenue in Norwood. One year later, the American Laundry Machinery Company opened a five-acre factory at Ross and Section Avenues.

City of Norwood
In 1902, the City of Cincinnati made the first of several attempts to annex Norwood. The citizens of Norwood rejected the merger by a margin of 55 votes. Later that year, Norwood citizens voted to incorporate the village as a city, since their population of 6,480 made them eligible for incorporation. This issue was decided by the same margin of 55 votes. Norwood's first city election took place in 1903. The newly elected officials repurposed the old wood frame Village Hall at Montgomery Road and Elm Avenue as the first City Hall of the City of Norwood.

1905 was a significant year for public services in Norwood. On July 1, the city established both the Norwood Fire Department and the Norwood Police Department. Later that year, the Andrew Carnegie Foundation provided funds to begin construction of Norwood's first public library. After two years of construction, the Norwood Public Library opened in 1907 on Montgomery Road in the same building that still exists today. It was designed by architect, John Scudder Adkins and was built on land donated by Edward Mills. It was the second Carnegie Library to open in the Cincinnati area. The City of Norwood transferred the property to the Public Library of Cincinnati and Hamilton County and it became a branch of that organization.

When Slane Avenue was built in the late-19th century, an ancient log cabin prevented the road from extending all the way to Floral Avenue. In 1906, the city purchased this property and passed an ordinance to destroy the cabin, allowing Slane Avenue to be extended through to Floral Avenue. The cabin was thought to be Norwood's oldest structure.

In 1908, Greek immigrants, Thomas and Nicholas Aglamesis, opened an ice cream parlor on Montgomery Road in Norwood. Five years later, they added a second store in neighboring Oakley. The Norwood store eventually closed, but their Oakley location, known as Aglamesis Bro's, remains a popular Cincinnati institution to this day.

The same year, the United States Playing Card Company opened a new 30-acre factory on Beech Street in Norwood. The factory would eventually grow to over 600,000 square feet of operations and become the largest manufacturer of playing cards in the world.

In 1909, Norwood officials began openly discussing the possibility of annexing neighboring Kennedy Heights. However, negotiations with Kennedy Heights officials eventually fell through and Kennedy Heights was later annexed by the City of Cincinnati.

In 1912, the Sears, Roebuck & Company purchased the Standard Mill Company at Section and Ross Avenues and changed the name to the Norwood Sash & Door Company. This factory became the primary manufacturer of Sears’ prefabricated Catalog Homes. The factory was operated by Sears in Norwood until 1945. The building was later destroyed in a massive fire in 2010.

New high school and city hall
Enrollment at Norwood High School continued to grow at a rapid pace and the student population eventually outgrew the first high school on Allison Street. In 1914, a new high school was constructed on Sherman Avenue and still remains in service today as Norwood Middle School. The original high school on Allison Street was converted into an elementary school.

Norwood's current city hall, the Norwood Municipal Building, was designed by John Scudder Adkins, who was also the architect for the Norwood Public Library building. It was constructed at the corner of Montgomery Road and Elm Avenue and opened in 1916. The building originally included a police station, jail, emergency hospital, and auditorium on the second floor (the stage and the balcony seats still remain today). The old Central School Building across the street was used as a temporary city hall during construction, but was demolished following the completion of the new building. The Norwood Municipal Building was added to the National Register of Historic Places on March 11, 1980.

An overheated furnace caused the old Allison High School building to burn down in 1917. It took Norwood firefighters 22 hours to get the blaze under control. The building was later rebuilt and remains in service today beside the original 1897 south elementary building. The same year, a new school at Williams Avenue was also constructed to replace the original 1892 Williams Avenue school.

More than 3,000 fans attended the season opener of the 1916 World Champion Norwood baseball team at Norwood Park. The park and ballfields were located on Smith Road where Grande Central Station shopping plaza is today. Norwood Park was also used during this era for other community entertainment events such as travelling circuses, an outdoor theater, and even Buffalo Bill's Wild West Show.

Industrial and infrastructure growth
According to a survey of historical records by the WPA, there were 47 factories in operation in Norwood by 1919.

In 1920, construction started on the Cincinnati Subway in downtown Cincinnati. The original plan was for a 16-mile loop to connect downtown with Norwood. Six subway stations were built in Cincinnati and several subway tunnels were completed in Norwood. The route would have taken passengers north from downtown through Ludlow, St. Bernard, and east through Norwood along the path of today's Norwood Lateral. The tracks would have then turned south near the location of today's Shea Stadium and followed Beech Street to the location of today's Interstate 71 before returning downtown. As subway construction continued into the late-1920s, the city experienced economic hardships and eventually abandoned the project completely in 1928, leaving the partially finished subway abandoned. One of the abandoned subway tunnels still exists in Norwood, running approximately 1,000 feet east–west along Harris Avenue, beneath the former Zumbiel Packaging building. For many years, the open tunnel was easily accessible from the adjacent Water Works Park baseball field and was regularly explored by the youth of Norwood. The entrances were eventually sealed with concrete in the early-2000s.

During the early-20th century, Norwood generated its own electricity at a municipal electric facility located at the Water Works plant on Harris Avenue. In 1920, Norwood sold the facility and electrical distribution system to Cincinnati Gas & Electric Company, allowing CG&E to provide electrical services to the city.

In 1921, a municipal swimming pool was opened in Victory Park, beside to the former Norwood Market House at the corner of Mills Avenue and Walter Avenue. Dressing room stalls were later added to the east side of the market house to allow bathers to change into their swimming costumes. The Market House opened at that location sometime between 1905 and 1910 and originally served Norwood as a farmers market. The building was converted into a roller rink and ice rink from 1926–1929 and later used as the Norwood Safety Lane automobile inspection facility from 1940–1981. From 1982 until the late-1990s, the Norwood Boxing Club trained fighters in the building. Today, the old Market House is used by the city for storage.

In 1922, General Motors purchased  of land at Smith Road and Park Avenue to construct the  Norwood Assembly automobile plant. This property was previously a large community park, ballfield, and circus ground known as Norwood Park. The Norwood Assembly Plant produced General Motors cars between 1923 and 1987, including the Chevrolet Bel Air, Biscayne, Impala, Nova, Caprice, Camaro, Pontiac Firebird, and the Buick Apollo. The first car to roll off the assembly line on August 13, 1923, was a Chevrolet Superior. The GM plant became the dominant employer in Norwood, with nearly 9,000 workers (including hundreds of Norwood residents) during its peak in the 1970s. It also contributed approximately 35% of the City of Norwood's tax base.

To promote the popularity of the card game, bridge, the United States Playing Card Company established a radio station in 1922 at their Beech Street factory with the call letters WSAI. Bridge experts played the game on the air and provided instruction to listeners. In 1926, the company built an 8-story bell tower atop the main factory building and installed a set of 12 carillon bells in the tower. The soothing sounds of the chiming bells were frequently broadcast on the station. The company operated WSAI in Norwood until it was sold to Crosley Broadcasting Corporation in 1928.

In an effort to improve Duck Creek Road, Norwood encased the once-beautiful Duck Creek waterway in a 4224 feet long, eight by ten feet, concrete aqueduct near Smith Road in 1923. The creek bed was filled in and all bridges spanning the waterway were removed. Most of Duck Creek road was later eliminated with the construction of Interstate 71 in the late-1960s.

Construction of the massive $1,000,000 Mt. Saint Mary's Seminary at Montgomery Road and Quatman Avenue was completed in 1923. The seminary would later educate dozens of future priests, bishops, and archbishops for the Catholic Church until it closed in 1980. The seminary was purchased in 1993 and renovated over the course of years and reopened as Our Lady of the Holy Spirit Center and as a Marian Spiritual center in consonance with the Roman Catholic Church.

In 1930, the City of Norwood rezoned the city council from four to six wards, reflecting the increase in the city's population. The six wards would later be rezoned back to four after the population declined in the 2000s.

Decline of the railway
In 1933, Norwood's last new passenger train station was constructed by the Pennsylvania Railroad on Harris Avenue, east of Water Works Park. This station was opened to complement the new Cincinnati Union Terminal station downtown. The station was later closed and the renovated building is now used as a social hall by the Norwood Fraternal Order of Eagles.

The same year, the Cincinnati, Lebanon & Northern Railroad, which ran along Lafayette Avenue behind Surrey Square, stopped providing passenger service. Rail travel in America was on the decline at this point due to the growing popularity of the automobile. Trains still carried freight along this line until the 1980s, when the tracks were removed after nearly one hundred years of service.

Albers Supermarket, the first supermarket in Ohio and the first grocery store in the world to call itself a supermarket, was opened in 1933 by William H. Albers on Montgomery Road in Norwood at the site of today's Surrey Square shopping center. Mr. Albers, the former president of the Kroger Company, went on to revolutionize the grocery industry by embracing many innovations such as shopping carts, fluorescent lighting, and individual pricing on all items. The Albers chain was a phenomenal success and was later acquired by Colonial Stores in 1955. The Norwood location was destroyed by a spectacular fire in 1968 and never rebuilt.

The Water Works swimming pool and shelter house opened in Water Works Park on Harris Avenue in 1935. The swimming facility was partially funded as a Great Depression Works Progress Administration project. The pool was rebuilt during the 1970s, but still operates today in the same location.

When the catastrophic Ohio River flood of 1937 halted the operation of the Cincinnati Water Works, Norwood came to the aid of Cincinnati by offering drinking water from its artesian wells. The Norwood Waterworks pumped 3,500,000 gallons of water a day during the emergency, with 2,500,000 gallons going to Cincinnati. Street flushing trucks were brought in from the City of Cleveland to haul the water from Norwood to downtown.

In 1940, Floral Avenue residents, Carl H. Lindner Sr. and his children Carl Lindner Jr., Robert, Richard, and Dorothy opened the first United Dairy Farmers store at 3955 Montgomery Road. Until this point, most people paid a premium to have milk delivered directly to their homes. United Dairy Farmers cut out the delivery middleman and sold milk at their store for nearly half the price of delivered milk. The UDF chain of stores eventually grew to over 200 locations in 3 states and helped make Carl Lindner Jr. one of the world's richest people.

In 1942, the General Motors Norwood Assembly Plant began helping the war effort by manufacturing landing gear, bomb heads and military trucks for World War II.

On July 8, 1942, thirty-four year-old Norwood police Sergeant Anthony H. Overberg became the first Norwood police officer killed in the line of duty. He was shot with his own gun during a struggle with a robber in a drug store on Franklin Avenue. The killer, Frank Dudley Carter, escaped but was later captured, convicted, and executed by the state of Ohio in 1945.

Concerned about the receding level of the water table in the Norwood artesian wells, the Norwood Water Commission purchased 225 acres of land near the Beechmont Levee in Linwood in 1947 with the intent of drilling future wells. The city also drilled a new well at the Harris Avenue Water Works plant two years later. The Linwood water works project was later scrapped and the city offered the Linwood land to Norwood residents in the late-1970s for use as community gardens.

In 1948, Norwood opened a large municipal parking lot at Washington Avenue and Montgomery Road on the site of the future Surrey Square shopping center. This was one of the first significant steps in the transformation of Norwood's downtown business district, known as "The Pike," from pedestrian-friendly storefronts to the Surrey Square automobile-centric strip mall.

The following year, streetcar lines in Norwood were eliminated and replaced by trolley buses, using the same overhead double electric lines. The streetcar tracks on Montgomery Road were paved over in 1955.

In 1949, Norwood purchased several acres of land south of Morton Avenue between Floral Avenue and Burwood, and dedicated it as Burwood Park. The following year, a children's swimming pool and shelter house were constructed in the new park.

By 1950, the oldest surviving building in Norwood was an 1863 log home at the northeast corner of Montgomery Road and Fenwick Avenue called the "Civil War House." It was used by veterans of the Grand Army of the Republic as a fraternal meeting space for fifty years. Unoccupied and in need of repairs, the City of Norwood condemned and demolished the building in 1950.

A new Williams Avenue elementary school and administration building were constructed in 1952 next to the existing 1917 school on Williams Avenue.

In 1958, a marble and bronze memorial with the names of Norwood veterans who died in World War I, World War II, and the Korean War was dedicated at Victory Park.

The same year, the new Norwood Branch Post Office opened on Sherman Avenue.

Around 1959, the water table of Norwood's artesian wells dropped to a level that became too expensive to maintain and Norwood began buying water from Cincinnati, as it continues to do today.

Ohio State Route 562, also known as the Norwood Lateral Expressway, was first completed between Interstate 75 and Reading Road in 1962. It was nicknamed the Norwood Lateral due to its close approach to Norwood, which at the time was Hamilton County's 2nd largest municipality. For nearly two decades, the "Lateral" terminated at Reading Road inside Cincinnati city limits. In 1969, work began on the extension of the "Lateral" into Norwood proper and connection to the proposed Interstate 71. The route of I-71 would pass through Norwood's east side. To accommodate the extension, nearly 200 homes in the old East Norwood neighborhood were razed, resulting in a loss of population and property tax revenue. Norwood was also required to share 5% of the cost of the expressway project. Property acquisition and clearing for the Lateral extension began in 1969. Work on the Norwood Lateral extension proceeded at the same time as work on the I-71 extension from Kenwood, Ohio to downtown Cincinnati. The full Norwood Lateral extension was completed in 1977, at about the same time as nearly all I-71 work was nearing completion.

At about the same time as the Norwood Lateral completion, the Globe-Wernicke Company moved operations out of Norwood to Tennessee. The factory on Carthage Avenue was closed and demolished two years later. GM purchased the property and used it as a parking lot for employees and newly built cars.

The overhead wires used to power the trolley buses and the street cars were removed from Norwood streets in 1965. The trolley buses, which had replaced street cars in 1949, were replaced by gasoline and diesel powered buses.

In 1966, the Norwood branch public library was remodeled and rededicated. As part of the renovations, the auditorium on the upper floor was closed. The auditorium still exists today, but remains closed to the public.

Surrey Square and decline of "The Pike"
Around 1967, Norwood's first strip mall, Norwood Plaza, opened at Ivanhoe Avenue and Montgomery Road. Business owners were concerned the strip mall would impact Norwood's "downtown" central business district.

After the Albers Supermarket on Montgomery Road was destroyed by fire in 1968, Norwood purchased the property and demolished the building as part of an urban renewal plan. This plan was centered around the construction of a new shopping center on Montgomery Road, which eventually became Surrey Square.

In 1972, the Plaza Theater and other small businesses on the east side of Montgomery Road north of Sherman Avenue were demolished as an additional phase of the urban renewal plan. The Plaza was the last of Norwood's old movie houses on "The Pike."

To accommodate growing enrollment, Norwood constructed a modern new high school on Sherman Avenue in 1972, adjacent to the old 1914 high school. The old high school became the middle school. The new state of the art high school included a television studio, swimming pool, and planetarium (now known as Drake Planetarium and Science Center). Since the new high school building was located on the old football field, the city also constructed an impressive new 5,000 seat football stadium, Shea Stadium, at Water Works Park.

In 1975, Surrey Square Shopping Center opened on Montgomery Road in the heart of the original shopping district. The enclosed mall was anchored by a Thriftway grocery store and later Central Hardware. Ironically, the inside of Surrey Square Mall was designed to look like a traditional small town main street, complete with fake storefronts reminiscent of the ones on "The Pike," which were destroyed by the construction of the mall. The interior of the mall included a Radio Shack, Getz Jewelers, a snack bar and several discount clothing stores.  The Thriftway grocery store was later sold to The Kroger Co.

In 1978, the Norwood Community/Senior Center was opened in the former St. Elizabeth School building on Carter Avenue.

The Norwood Historical Society was chartered on May 2, 1978.

In 1985, Norwood natives Carl Lindner Jr. and his brother Robert Lindner donated $150,000 to the City of Norwood so it could purchase the 14-acre McCullough Estate at Cypress Way and Indian Mound Avenue. The Ohio Department of Natural Resources also awarded a matching grant so the estate could be converted into a nature preserve and park. The estate was part of the original 100-acre McCullough Seed Company property the McCullough Family settled in 1850 and operated on this land until 1960. Although the park is located in Cincinnati, it is owned and operated as a City of Norwood park. Norwood now totaled 30-acres of recreation land among 9 city parks.

GM closure
On November 6, 1986, General Motors announced that it would close the Norwood Assembly automobile plant as part of a $10 billion plan to reorganize the company due to competition from foreign automakers. Many Norwood employees expected Norwood's sister plant, Van Nuys Assembly, to close instead. However, GM stated that the aging 63-year-old Norwood plant's multi-story design would be difficult to modernize and the 60-acre campus was "landlocked" with no room for expansion. The company also cited high absenteeism, low productivity and low quality control as additional factors in its decision.

The closure of the plant in 1987 nearly dealt a death blow to Norwood's economy. GM was by far the largest employer in Norwood and its income and property taxes accounted for one-third of the city's operating budget and one-fifth of the money for its schools. Approximately 1,000 of the factory's 4,300 workers were Norwood residents.

As a result of the closure, Norwood City Council dramatically slashed the city's budget, including police, fire, city services, and infrastructure improvements. 40 city employees were laid off and the school district closed an elementary school and laid off 11 percent of its teachers. Norwood's parks, roads, buildings, water lines began to deteriorate. The City of Cincinnati even considered annexing Norwood to help with financial problems, but the plan was rebuffed by Cincinnati Mayor Charles Luken, who said he had no intention of "taking advantage of Norwood's misfortune." Norwood's mayor, Joseph E. Sanker, publicly speculated that Cincinnati was not interested in Norwood without the GM plant.

Norwood's economic issues continued to worsen in 1988 when another long-time manufacturing business, R. K. LeBlond Machine Tool Company, closed its Norwood factory near the border of Hyde Park. An additional 250 jobs were lost.

The same year, Norwood celebrated its 100th anniversary of incorporation as a village with a centennial parade.

In 1989, Norwood's last remaining newspaper, The Norwood Enterprise, ceased publication. It had been in print since 1894. The newspaper cited lack of advertising revenue from local businesses due to the economic downturn from the closure of GM. Other Norwood community newspapers have occasionally started in the years since the Enterprise ceased publication, but none have lasted more than a few years. The Norwood Star currently operates as a monthly newspaper mailed to subscribers and available at local stores.

Economic revitalization
Despite the dire financial situation in Norwood, it did not take long for the city to realize the closing of General Motors was an opportunity to transition its image from a blue-collar industrial city to a business and retail destination. In 1989, city signed a deal with the Belvedere Corporation to develop both the former GM site as well as the east side of Montgomery Road between Sherman Avenue and Elm Avenue. The same year, the city also made plans to build an upscale retail and restaurant complex called Rookwood Pavilion on the site of the old LeBlond plant.

In 1990, the first of these new projects, a shopping plaza called Grand Central Station, opened on Smith Road at the site of the old GM plant. The facility offered a mix of stores, restaurants, and businesses and was anchored by a discount multiplex movie theater. A new street, Wall Street, was built to connect Smith Road with a new extension of Wesley Avenue. The city also attempted to extend Wesley Avenue all the way to Park Avenue, but two long-time Park Avenue residents produced the original 1890 deed dedicating the center "park" islands on Park Avenue "to public use forever for park purposes only." As a result, the city abandoned plans for the extension.

In July 1990, a cleaning solvent leak at the BASF chemical plant on the border of Norwood and Evanston resulted in a massive explosion, killing two and injuring 90 people. The blast heavily damaged Norwood businesses on Montgomery Road and affected Norwood homes as far as a mile away.

In 1993, the Belvedere Corporation opened a second new development called Central Parke at the northeast corner of Montgomery and Sherman Avenues. The project consisted of three mixed-use office buildings, totalling  of office space. The facility was anchored by 1,700 free parking spaces at the former GM parking garage. With free parking and commercial rents half those of downtown Cincinnati, the development was an immediate success. Within 6 months, all of the Central Parke properties were occupied, employing more than 1,000 office workers.

In 1993, developers opened the Rookwood Pavilion shopping center on the grounds of the old Lablond factory site at Edwards Road and Madison Road. The shopping center was a revolutionary concept in Cincinnati at the time, as it was the first outdoor mall to offer big box stores alongside speciality shops and restaurants. It also happened to be ideally located on Interstate 71 next to upscale Hyde Park, providing convenient access to a large population of affluent shoppers (many shoppers mistakenly believed the property was actually located in Hyde Park). Rookwood Pavilion was wildly successful and prompted developers to begin purchasing additional land in the area for future developments.

In 2000, Rookwood Commons shopping center opened immediately behind Rookwood Pavilion on Edmondson Road. This new open-air mall offered a mix of high-end retail stores and restaurants not previously found in Hamilton County, and immediately became one of Cincinnati's premier shopping destinations. A large office building called Rookwood Tower was also opened on the property.

Despite sporadic efforts to save what was remaining of "The Pike," the city allowed the demolition of several historic storefronts and buildings at the corner of Sherman Avenue and Montgomery in 2002. They were replaced by a Walgreens drive-thru drugstore and parking lot.

In 2004, Norwood was forced by the State of Ohio to reduce the number of city council wards from 6 to 4, to reflect a decline in population. Norwood's population of 21,675 at the 2000 census was the smallest it had been since sometime between 1910 and 1920.

Norwood also lost a significant amount of public transportation in 2004 when the Southwest Ohio Regional Transit Authority eliminated all but two bus routes in the city. Some of the eliminated routes had serviced the city by either bus or streetcar for over 100 years.

In fall of 2004, another new development called Cornerstone At Norwood was constructed on 4.5 acres of land at the southeast corner of Smith Road and Williams Avenue. The property was previously occupied by low rent apartment buildings and homes. Two additional office buildings were later opened on the Cornerstone property in the two years that follow.

Eminent domain
After the runaway success of the two Rookwood shopping centers, the developer, Jeffrey Anderson, approached the City of Norwood regarding a third project called Rookwood Exchange that he wanted to build across the street. He proposed bulldozing a small 11-acre residential neighborhood of 79 houses and businesses and replacing them with a massive new mixed-use residential, office, and retail development. The redeveloped property would generate an estimated $2,000,000 in annual revenue for Norwood.

The city approved the plan and Anderson began purchasing the neighborhood properties in 2005 through voluntary sales. All of the property owners eventually agreed to sell except for three which refused to leave. In an effort to clear the remaining properties, Anderson paid for a study declaring the neighborhood a "deteriorating area" so the City of Norwood could use eminent domain to force the remaining property owners to sell.

The three property owners fought Norwood's use of eminent domain, and the dispute eventually made national headlines in 2006 when it was brought before the Ohio Supreme Court in Norwood, Ohio v. Horney. The court ruled unanimously for the property owners, forcing the city and developers to return ownership of the three properties. After the verdict, the property owners held out for several more years before eventually selling. The second to last property was sold to the developer in 2007 for $650,000.

In September 2008, the final property owner agreed to sell his rental home to the developer for 1.25 million.

Continued development
In 2006, developers broke ground on Linden Pointe on the Lateral, a large office park complex on the old former American Laundry Machine Company and Globe Wernicke properties located north of the Lateral between Section Avenue and Montgomery Road. Because the property was Brownfield land, it had to be decontaminated prior to construction. As part of the project, Carthage Avenue between Ross Avenue and Montgomery Road was permanently closed, ending the continuous path of the 200+ year-old "County Road" through Norwood.

There were several notable economic changes in Norwood in 2008. After more than 100 years in Norwood, the US Playing Card Company closed their Beech Street factory and moved operations to Boone County, Kentucky.

Surrey Square shopping center underwent a major reconstruction and expansion, with addition of a  Kroger anchor store, a large cafeteria-sized McDonald's restaurant and several mid-size businesses.

The old Sherwin-Williams paint store at the intersection of Montgomery and Smith Roads was torn down and the new medical center was constructed in its place.

Xavier University acquired the old Norwood Plaza shopping center and demolished many of the structures to make way for campus expansion.

In 2014, after many years of legal battles and construction delays, Rookwood Exchange finally opened across Edmondson Road from Rookwood Pavilion and Commons. The new complex included two restaurants, a hotel, office building and parking garage.

In a joint effort with Norwood and Cincinnati, Xavier University opened University Station, a 20-acre, mixed-use development on Cleneay Avenue. The 20-acre site straddled both Norwood and Evanston and was previously occupied by Zumbiel Packaging and the BASF plant which tragically exploded in 1990. The project included 180 housing units for Xavier University students, a university bookstore, retail and restaurants. Additional development is planned for a second phase of construction on the Evanston side of the property.

Geography
Norwood is located at  (39.160060, −84.455074).

The southern, eastern, and western areas of the city lie mostly on flat terrain, while the northern half of the city is characterized by a steeper elevation. That site is one of the highest land elevations in southwest Ohio. It is believed the burial mound was built at that site due to the high elevation.

Near the burial mound are two large water towers, built in the 19th century, which Norwood uses to store water and regulate water pressure throughout its city. The towers were curious points of interest in the early 20th century. Because they were built with spiral staircases (long since removed), people rode horses or took carriage rides to the towers in order to climb the stairs and view growing Cincinnati to the south and countryside to the north. Norwood is credited with coming to the aid of Cincinnati residents during the Ohio River flood of 1937. Cincinnati's drinking water was largely contaminated so their residents depended on Norwood for fresh water, which Norwood had stored safely in the towers, above flood waters.

Demographics

2010 census
As of the census of 2010, there were 19,207 people, 8,320 households, and 4,190 families residing in the city. The racial makeup of the city was 86.6% White, 7.6% African American, 0.4% Native American, 0.8% Asian, 0.1% Pacific Islander, 2.0% from other races, and 2.5% from two or more races. Hispanic or Latino of any race were 5.1% of the population.

There were 8,320 households, of which 25.3% had children under the age of 18 living with them, 30.1% were married couples living together, 14.5% had a female householder with no husband present, 5.8% had a male householder with no wife present, and 49.6% were non-families. 37.9% of all households were made up of individuals, and 9% had someone living alone who was 65 years of age or older. The average household size was 2.28 and the average family size was 3.03.

The median age in the city was 33.4 years. 20.2% of residents were under the age of 18; 14.3% were between the ages of 18 and 24; 30.3% were from 25 to 44; 24.2% were from 45 to 64; and 11.1% were 65 years of age or older. The gender makeup of the city was 49.9% male and 50.1% female.

As of the 2010 United States Census, The median value of owner-occupied housing units between 2005–2009 was $120,900. The home ownership rate from 2005–2009 was 57.8%. The median household income 2005–2009 was $39,224. The per capita money income in past 12 months (2009 dollars) 2005–2009 was $21,367. People of all ages in poverty from 2005–2009 was 20.6%.

2000 census
During the 2000 United States Census there were 21,675 people, 9,270 households, and 5,154 families residing in the Norwood. The population density was 6,956.5 people per square mile (2,682.3/km). There were 10,044 housing units at an average density of 3,223.6 per square mile (1,243.0/km). The racial makeup of the city was 94.25% White, 2.35% African American, 0.36% Native American, 0.77% Asian, 0.02% Pacific Islander, 0.88% from other races, and 1.37% from two or more races. Hispanic or Latino of any race were 1.85% of the population. There were 9,270 households, out of which 26.7% had children under the age of 18 living with them, 36.8% were married couples living together, 13.7% had a female householder with no husband present, and 44.4% were non-families. 36.3% of all households were made up of individuals, and 11.1% had someone living alone who was 65 years of age or older. The average household size was 2.31 and the average family size was 3.04. In the city the age distribution of the population shows 23.4% under the age of 18, 11.9% from 18 to 24, 32.4% from 25 to 44, 19.7% from 45 to 64, and 12.6% who were 65 years of age or older. The median age was 34 years. For every 100 females, there were 94.9 males. For every 100 females age 18 and over, there were 90.9 males. The median income for a household in the city was $32,223, and the median income for a family was $39,951. Males had a median income of $31,530 versus $25,852 for females. The per capita income for the city was $18,108. About 8.6% of families and 12.9% of the population were below the poverty line, including 15.3% of those under age 18 and 7.5% of those age 65 or over.

Government
The elected members of Norwood City government are: the mayor, president of council, auditor, treasurer, law director, clerk of council, four ward-specific city council members and three at-large city council members.  Norwood City School Board members are also elected.  The City of Norwood has its own police, fire, and public works departments.  The current mayor of Norwood is Victor Schneider, the police chief is William Kramer, the fire chief is Thomas McCabe, and the public works superintendent is Clinton Zimmerman.

Economy
Norwood has a strong history of industry and manufacturing dating back to the historic Norwood Brick plant of the late 19th century, which provided clay brick for the construction of many of Cincinnati's historic buildings. As the city is ideally situated between several major railways, state roads and interstate highways, it has traditionally been an attractive location for businesses and corporations in the area. Norwood was once described as the "Chicago of Hamilton County", for in 1909 it had 49 manufacturing enterprises.

Prominent Norwood industrial and manufacturing companies included: General Motors Norwood Assembly, United Dairy Farmers, Allis-Chalmers, Siemens, Bullock Electric Manufacturing Company, United States Playing Card Company, Globe Wernicke, American Laundry Machine Company, Norwood Sash & Door Company (Sears Catalog Homes), United States Printing & Lithographing Company, U.S. Shoe Corp, Mead Container Corporation, J.H. Day Corporation, and Zumbiel Packaging.

Between 1923 and 1987, the General Motors automobile assembly plant was by far the city's largest employer in terms of production, payroll and employees. When GM closed the factory in 1987, it nearly dealt a death blow to Norwood's economy. This event became the catalyst for Norwood's transition from an industrial economy to a diversified office and retail economy. In the years following the GM closure, Norwood worked with developers to build many mixed-use office parks and retail centers in the city, including: Grande Central Station (1990), Central Parke (1993), Rookwood Pavilion (1995), Rookwood Commons (2000), Cornerstone at Norwood (2004), Linden Pointe on the Lateral (2007), Surrey Square (2008), Rookwood Exchange (2014), Norwood State Station (2014).

Education
The Norwood City School District consists of Norwood High School, Norwood Middle School, Sharpsburg Elementary, Norwood View Elementary, Williams Avenue Elementary, and Norwood Preschool. The current high school opened as a state-of-the-art facility in 1972, with a planetarium, greenhouse, swimming pool, and television studio. Drake Planetarium, named after astronomer and astrophysicist Frank Drake, is associated with NASA. Norwood High School's mascot is the Indian. Norwood Middle School is located next to the high school in the previous high school building, which opened in 1914. In 1988, the Norwood Middle School field house and offices were used to film prison scenes in the 1989 Tom Selleck movie An Innocent Man. Norwood is also home to Immaculate Conception Academy parochial grade school and high school, located in the former Gressle School on Floral Avenue.

Sports and recreation

Norwood Recreation Commission
The Norwood Recreation Commission was established in 1943, by ordinance of the City Council.  The commission is unique in that it is a non-political joint effort between the city and Board of Education.  The commission consists of five policy makers; two selected by the Board of Education and three appointed by the mayor.

The Norwood Recreation Commission operates and supervises four playgrounds and three swimming pools during the summer months.  Permits for ball diamonds, tennis courts and picnic areas are also issued through the Recreation office. The Recreation Commission conducts leagues for 30 softball teams for men and women in addition to assisting and cooperating with the Norwood Knothole Association and Norwood Soccer Association in providing facilities for all their teams.  In the past the Norwood Recreation Commission has moved into the schools with its Fall, Winter, and Spring programs.

Swimming pools:
 Burwood Pool (closed)
 Fenwick Pool (closed)
 Millcrest Pool (closed)
 Northwoods Pool (closed)
 Norwood High School Pool
 Norwood Middle School Pool (closed)
 Victory Pool (closed)
 Waterworks J.B. Wirth Pool

Parks:
 Burwood Park
 Dorl Park
 Fenwick Park
 Hunter Park
 Lindner Park Nature Preserve
 Marsh Park
 Millcrest Park
 Lower Millcrest Park
 Northwoods Park
 Tower Park
 Victory Park
 Waterworks Park

Nicknames
Norwood is known as the "Gem of the Highlands".

Notable people
The people listed below were all born in, residents of, or otherwise closely associated with Norwood, Ohio

Arts and entertainment
 George Chakiris, actor and dancer Academy Award for Best Supporting Actor and Golden Globe Award for Best Supporting Actor - Motion Picture for his role as Bernardo, leader of the "Sharks", in 1961 film West Side Story. Appeared as dancer alongside Norwood native Vera-Ellen in White Christmas. Also appeared in several motion pictures including The Great Caruso, Stars and Stripes Forever, Diamonds Are a Girl's Best Friend, Gentlemen Prefer Blondes and Diamond Head. Appeared in motion picture musicals Brigadoon and There's No Business Like Show Business. Appeared in several television series including Medical Center, Hawaii Five-O, Wonder Woman, Fantasy Island, CHiPs, Dallas, Santa Barbara, Matt Houston, Scarecrow and Mrs. King and Murder, She Wrote. He also appeared in the final scene of the final episode of The Partridge Family  
 Paul Delph, keyboardist for band Zoo Drive, played organ on Toni Basil's #1 Billboard hit song "Mickey"
 Henry Farny, French-born painter and illustrator, known for work depicting Native American life, first artist hired by Rookwood Pottery Company
 Tim Lucas, novelist and film critic, got his start as critic and cartoonist for Norwood High School's newspaper The Mirror
 Mr. Dibbs, hip hop producer, touring DJ for Atmosphere and El-P, resident of Norwood
 Jack Mullaney, actor, movies (Little Big Man, South Pacific, Spinout and Tickle Me); television production (Kraft Theatre Playhouse); television series (My Living Doll, It's About Time, Ensign O'Toole, The Ann Sothern Show, The Many Loves of Dobie Gillis and  That Girl
 Over The Rhine, Ohio folk music band recorded several albums in their Hopkins Avenue home, "The Grey Ghost"
 Jody Payne, musician, longtime guitarist for Willie Nelson, 1954 graduate of Norwood High School
 Diane Pfister, artist and art lecturer whose work was first recognized in London, England
 Louis Rebisso, Italian sculptor known for statues of General Grant in Lincoln Park, Chicago and Benjamin Harrison in Piatt Park, Cincinnati
 Janice Rule, actress, stage productions including Broadway's Miss Liberty, Picnic and The Flowering Peach; motion pictures including Goodbye, My Fancy, Bell, Book and Candle, The Chase, Invitation to a Gunfighter, Welcome to Hard Times, Missing and American Flyers; Television series including The Fugitive, Checkmate, The Twilight Zone, Route 66, 3 Women and the debut episode of Have Gun – Will Travel  
 Amanda Tepe, actress who has appeared on The Wizards of Waverly Place, General Hospital, and in Rob Zombie's Halloween
 Vera-Ellen, actress and dancer, White Christmas, Call Me Madam, On the Town
 John Ellsworth Weis, painter, known for his impressionistic landscapes

Business
 Samuel Frisch, opened Frisch's Stag Lunch in Norwood in 1910, first location of Frisch's Big Boy restaurant chain
 Carl Lindner Jr., expanded father's dairy business into United Dairy Farmers; banker and financier, American Financial Group, Great American Insurance; holdings included Chiquita Brands, John Morrell Meats, Taft Broadcasting, Hanna-Barbera Productions; controlling partner and CEO of Cincinnati Reds

Science and medicine
 John Uri Lloyd, pharmacist, scientist, and twice president of American Pharmaceutical Association
 Frank Bradway Rogers, medical doctor and librarian instrumental in changing Army Medical Library into National Medical Library

Law and politics
 Joseph B. Foraker, 37th Governor of Ohio and a Republican United States Senator
 Joseph Ralston, former Vice Chairman of the Joint Chiefs of Staff and Supreme Allied Commander for NATO in Europe

Sports
 Bob Barton, professional baseball player, catcher in Major Leagues from 1965–1974 San Francisco Giants, Cincinnati Reds, San Diego Padres 
 Carl Bouldin, professional baseball pitcher for Washington Senators and basketball player on 1961 NCAA champion University of Cincinnati Bearcats 
 Marc Edwards, NFL fullback for San Francisco 49ers, Cleveland Browns and  Super Bowl XXXVI champion New England Patriots
 Roy Golden, Major League Baseball pitcher for St. Louis Cardinals, [Washington Senators], [Chicago White Sox], [Philadelphia Athletics]
 Ed Jucker, head coach of University of Cincinnati NCAA basketball championships in 1961 and 1962 and head coach for NBA's Cincinnati Royals
 Dorothy Kamenshek, professional baseball player for Rockford Peaches of AAGPBL, inspiration for Geena Davis character in movie A League Of Their Own
 Ed "Specs" Klieman, professional baseball player, pitcher for Washington Senators, Chicago White Sox, Philadelphia Athletics and 1948 World Series champion Cleveland Indians
 Maxwell Holt, bronze medal winner for the 2016 United States Men's Olympic Volleyball Team and Gold Medal for the 2014 FIVB Volleyball World League. Also played for Modena Volley professional volleyball team in Italy.
 Brad Loesing,  professional basketball player PVSK Panthers in Hungary, Landstede Basketbal in Netherlands, Riesen Ludwigsburg in Germany and EWE Baskets in Germany
 George Miller, professional baseball player, catcher for Cincinnati Red Stockings
 Larry Pape, Major League pitcher for Boston Red Sox
 Heinie Peitz, baseball player, catcher for St. Louis Cardinals, Cincinnati Reds, Pittsburgh Pirates
 Arthur Pickens, thoroughbred horse racing jockey, who won 1908 Kentucky Derby
 Brian Pillman, football player with NFL Cincinnati Bengals, WWE wrestler known as "The Loose Canon" and "Flyin' Brian" Pillman
 Thomas Scott, archer at 1904 Summer Olympics, oldest archer to appear in Olympics. His daughter Lida Scott Matilda Howell was also an archer and also competed in the 1904 Summer Olympics, where she won three gold medals
 Ralph Sharman, professional baseball player for Philadelphia Athletics
 Dominique Steele, professional mixed martial artist in Welterweight division of Ultimate Fighting Championship
 Bob Wellman, professional baseball player for Philadelphia Athletics, manager in minor leagues

Religion
 Ralph W. Beiting, founder of the Christian Appalachian Project and author of twelve books on Appalachia and its people
 Joseph R. Binzer, current auxiliary bishop of the Archdiocese of Cincinnati, Ohio, since 2011
 Robert Daniel Conlon, current bishop of the Diocese of Joliet, Illinois, since 2011
 Paul Vincent Donovan, first bishop of the Diocese of Kalamazoo, from 1971 to 1994
 James Henry Garland, bishop of the Diocese of Marquette, Michigan, from 1992 to 2005
 Henry Joseph Grimmelsmann, first bishop of Evansville, from 1944 to 1965
 Clarence George Issenmann, Bishop of Cleveland from 1966 to 1974
 Paul Francis Leibold, Bishop of Evansville from 1966 to 1969 and Archbishop of Cincinnati from 1969 to 1972
 Edward A. McCarthy, the second archbishop of Miami, Florida, from 1976 to 1974
 Carl K. Moeddel, auxiliary bishop of the Archdiocese of Cincinnati from 1993 to 2007
 Henry K. Moeller, Archbishop of Cincinnati from 1904 to 1925, built St. Mary's Seminary, namesake of Moeller Avenue and Moeller High School
 Anthony John King Mussio, the first bishop of Steubenville, Ohio from 1945 to 1977
 Leo Aloysius Pursley, Bishop of Fort Wayne-South Bend from 1956 to 1976
 George John Rehring, Bishop of Toledo from 1950 to 1967
 Michael William Warfel, current bishop of the Diocese of Great Falls-Billings, Montana, since 2007

Crime
 Robert Bales, United States Army soldier and perpetrator of the 2012 Kandahar massacre
 Robert Anthony Buell, convicted of the murder of 11-year-old Krista Harrison

References

External links

 City website
 Norwood Recreation Commission
 Norwood Star Newspaper

 
Cities in Ohio
Cities in Hamilton County, Ohio
Enclaves in the United States
1809 establishments in Ohio